Col. David Hall House is a historic home located at Lewes, Sussex County, Delaware. The main house dates to about 1780, and is a -story, three-bay, frame structure.  A lower -story wing was added about 1805.  The main house is sheathed in its original cypress shingles and the wing in cedar shakes.  It was the home of Colonel David Hall (1752-1817), who served as Governor of Delaware.

It was added to the National Register of Historic Places in 1976.

References

External links

Houses on the National Register of Historic Places in Delaware
Houses completed in 1805
Houses in Lewes, Delaware
Historic American Buildings Survey in Delaware
1805 establishments in Delaware
National Register of Historic Places in Sussex County, Delaware